Luciano Xavier Cunha, known as Assis (born 27 February 1979), is a Brazilian footballer.

Luciano made his professional debut for Iraty Sport Club in the Campeonato Paranaense. 
In August 2003 Luciano transferred to Spartak Ivano-Frankivsk. After, he played for L.D. Alajuelense in Costa Rica. Luciano was transferred from the United Arab Emirates side Dibba Al-Fujairah Cultural S.C. to Goiânia Esporte Clube on March 8, 2007 He spent the following season with Palmas Futebol e Regatas in the Campeonato Tocantinense.

References

External links
 

1979 births
Living people
Brazilian footballers
L.D. Alajuelense footballers
FC Spartak Ivano-Frankivsk players
Liga FPD players
Association football forwards
Expatriate footballers in Ukraine
Expatriate footballers in Costa Rica
Expatriate footballers in the United Arab Emirates
Brazilian expatriate sportspeople in Ukraine
Palmas Futebol e Regatas players
Iraty Sport Club players
Dibba FC players
Goiânia Esporte Clube players